Barton Springs Pool is a recreational outdoor swimming pool that is filled entirely with water from nearby natural springs. It is located on the grounds of Zilker Park in Austin, Texas. The pool exists within the channel of Barton Creek and utilizes water from Main Barton Spring, the fourth largest spring in Texas.

History 
Long before Barton Springs Pool was built, the springs were considered sacred and were used for purification rituals by the Tonkawa Native American tribe who inhabited the area. Spanish explorers first found the springs in the 17th century, and around 1730 erected temporary missions at the site (later moving to San Antonio).

In 1837, soon after incorporation of the city of Austin, William ("Uncle Billy") Barton, the springs' namesake, settled the area.  Barton named the three separate springs after his three daughters: Parthenia, Eliza, and Zenobia.  He, and subsequent owners of the property, recognized its value as a tourist attraction, and promoted it vigorously, thus leading to the swimming hole's lasting popularity.

The last private owner of the property, Andrew Jackson Zilker, deeded it to Austin in 1918. During the 1920s, the city undertook a construction project to create a larger swimming area by damming the springs and building sidewalks.  The bathhouse was designed in 1947 by Dan Driscoll, who also designed the bathhouse at Deep Eddy Pool.

Operation of the pool 

The pool is usually open to the public from 5:00am to 10:00pm, daily.  During this time, the floodgates on the pool's dam are closed, and Main Barton Spring fills the pool to a maximum depth of more than 18 feet.  At the upper end of the pool, another dam prevents surface water from Barton Creek from entering the pool by diverting it through a tunnel under the sidewalks.

Although admission to the pool is free from November through mid March, from mid March to October a small fee ($1 to $8 for residents of Austin) is charged for entry after 8:00am. Every evening after 9:00pm during the charging season, admission is free until closing. Summer passes, valid from Memorial Day to Labor Day, are also available. 

Lifeguards are usually present except before 8:00am, when swimmers are cautioned to "swim at your own risk". The pool is surrounded by grassy slopes and beautiful trees with plenty of shade. Items prohibited from entering the facility include coolers, food, non-resealable beverages other than water, glass containers, alcohol, loud speakers, pets other than service animals, and bicycles. Flotation devices are permitted at either end of the pool, but not allowed in the middle.

On Thursdays, the pool is closed for cleaning from 9:00am until 7:00pm.  The floodgates are sometimes partially opened, lowering the water level in the pool by several feet.  Employees then buff or blast pressured water against the limestone bottom of the pool's shallow end, as well as the steps and ramps leading into the water, in order to wash away the hazardous and slippery algae buildup. In the deep end, a fire hose is used to push debris toward the downstream dam. Overgrown vegetation is also trimmed on cleaning days. Once a year the pool is closed for several weeks for more extensive cleaning.

The pool is closed during flash flood warnings as Barton Creek may flood and overflow the diversion dam.  Swimming in Barton Springs Pool is then unsafe, as it transforms into a raging creek. The pool is then closed for several days after a flood, so mud and debris that washed into the pool can be removed. Other unplanned reasons for pool closure include lightning or thunder in the area, "search and rescue" situations, serious medical emergencies, high fecal coliform count, and chemical spills (either inside the pool itself or over the Barton Springs segment of the Edwards Aquifer).

Environmental issues 
The pool has been closed to the public a number of times since the 1980s due to unsafe levels of fecal coliform (E. coli) bacteria in its waters.  The source of contamination is still undetermined: many point to upstream urban development as the cause, although others note that high bacteria levels were seen in the 1950s, when development was less pervasive. Contamination is usually worse after heavy rains due to the flushing of the effluent of upstream subdivisions into the Edwards Aquifer recharge zone which feeds the springs.

The environmental conditions of the springs gave birth to a local political movement called the Save Our Springs Alliance (SOS).  SOS became a force in Austin municipal politics, leading to many "green" initiatives involving environmental issues in addition to those of the springs.

Robert Redford, who first learned to swim at Barton Springs Pool, has also been an outspoken ally. In 2007 he and Terrence Malick co-produced The Unforeseen, a documentary highlighting environmental impact to the Edwards aquifer from the surrounding real estate subdivision.

Another environmental issue involving the springs and the pool emerged with the discovery of the Barton Springs salamander, a federally listed endangered or threatened species which only exists in the pool and a few surrounding environs. After some debate, and studies by the city of Austin, Texas state agencies, and the U.S. Fish and Wildlife Service, it was determined that swimmers and salamanders could co-exist (as they had probably been doing for some time).

References

External links

 City of Austin – Parks and Recreation Department: Barton Springs
 Will van Overbeek's Barton Springs photos
 Friends of Barton Springs Pool
 Save Our Springs Alliance
 Barton Springs/Edwards Aquifer Conservation District
 The Edwards Aquifer Website
 Temperature Map of Barton Springs Pool
 Barton Springs Pool, Soul of the City
 

Swimming venues in Austin, Texas
Buildings and structures in Austin, Texas
Tourist attractions in Austin, Texas
Landmarks in Austin, Texas